Lotus Lady is a 1930 American drama film directed by Phil Rosen and starring Fern Andra, Ralph Emerson and Betty Francisco.

Cast
 Fern Andra as Tamarah  
 Ralph Emerson as Larry Kelland 
 Betty Francisco as Claire Winton  
 Lucien Prival as Castro  
 Frank Leigh as Brent 
 Edward Cecil as George Kelland  
 Junior Pironne as Laddie  
 James B. Leong as Li  
 Joyzelle Joyner as The Dancer

References

Bibliography
 Palmer, Scott. British Film Actors' Credits, 1895-1987. McFarland, 1988.

External links
 

1930 films
1930 drama films
1930s English-language films
American drama films
Films directed by Phil Rosen
American black-and-white films
1930s American films